The 1996 FIBA Intercontinental Cup was the 22nd edition of the FIBA Intercontinental Cup for men's professional basketball clubs and the 21st edition of the tournament being in the form of a true intercontinental tournament. It was contested through a best-of-three playoff format, in September 1996, in order to determine the world club champion. It was contested between the winners of the 1995–96 season of the FIBA European League, Panathinaikos, and Olimpia, the winners of the 1996 edition of the FIBA South American League.

The first game of the 3 game series was held on 4 September 1996, at the Estadio Cubierto Newell's Old Boys, the home arena of Olimpia. Olimpia won the first game of the series by a score of 89–83. The Olympic Indoor Hall hosted the last 2 games, on 10 September 1996, and 12 September 1996. Panathinaikos won the second and third games of the series, and became the 1996 world club champions.

Series summary 

Panathinaikos won the series 2-1.

Game 1 

Olimpia: Montecchia 6, Racca 25, Wilson 8, Jadlow 21, Uranga 7, Victoriano 12, Gutiérrez 2, Nocioni 2, Zulberti 6.

Panathinaikos: Dinkins 7, Alvertis 21, Koch 0, Amaechi 23, Martínez 8, Oikonomou 8, Georgikopoulos 0, Sconochini 16.

Game 2 

Panathinaikos: Dinkins 7, Sconochini 3, Alvertis 30, Oikonomou 16, Amaechi 19, Koch 8, Martínez 0.

Olimpia: Montecchia 5, Racca 11, Wilson 15, Uranga 4, Jadlow 9, Gutiérrez 5, Victoriano 23, Zulberti 0, Nocioni 6.

Game 3 

Panathinaikos: Dinkins 24, Sconochini 12, Alvertis 8, Oikonomou 9, Amaechi 18, Koch 9, Martínez 13, Georgikopoulos 5, Skoutaris 3.

Olimpia: Montecchia 1, Racca 28, Wilson 6, Uranga 2, Jadlow 20, Gutiérrez 0, Victoriano 14, Zulberti 5, Nocioni 0, Burgos 0.

Rosters

External links 
 1996 Intercontinental Basketball Cup
 1996 Intercontinental Basketball Cup
 1996 Intercontinental Basketball Cup 
 1996 Intercontinental Basketball Cup 
 Panathinaikos, team presentation, September 1996 

1996
1996 in Argentine sport
1996–97 in European basketball
1996–97 in Greek basketball
1996–97 in South American basketball
International basketball competitions hosted by Argentina
International basketball competitions hosted by Greece